Tetris (styled TETЯIS) is a puzzle game developed by Atari Games and originally released for arcades in 1988. Based on Alexey Pajitnov's Tetris, Atari Games' version features the same gameplay as the computer editions of the game, as players must stack differently shaped falling blocks to form and eliminate horizontal lines from the playing field. The game features several difficulty levels and two-player simultaneous play.

In 1989, Atari Games released a port of their arcade version under their Tengen label for the Nintendo Entertainment System, despite it not being licensed by Nintendo for the system. There were also issues with the publishing rights for Tetris, and after much legal wrangling, Nintendo itself ended up with the rights to publish console versions, leaving Atari with only the rights to arcade versions. As a result, the Tengen game was only on the shelf for four weeks before Atari was legally required to recall the game and destroy any remaining inventory of its NES version.

Nintendo produced its own version for the NES as well as a version for the Game Boy. Both versions were commercially successful and Nintendo held the Tetris license for many years. With fewer than 100,000 copies known to exist, the Tengen release has since become a collector's item, due to its short time on the market. Various publications have since noted that Tengen's Tetris was in some ways superior to the official NES release, especially since the Tengen game featured a two-player simultaneous mode not available in Nintendo's version.

Development and history

In 1987, Soviet Academy of Sciences researcher Alexey Pajitnov (who invented the original game in 1984) alongside Dmitry Pavlovsky and Vadim Gerasimov developed a new version of Tetris out of a desire to create a two-player puzzle game. Andromeda Software executive Robert Stein approached Pajitnov with an offer to distribute Tetris worldwide, and secured the rights to license the title. He in turn sub-licensed the rights to Mirrorsoft for the European market and Spectrum HoloByte for the North American market. After seeing the game run on an Atari ST, programmer Ed Logg petitioned Atari Games to license it for an arcade version, and approached Stein. With the rights secured, Atari Games produced an arcade version of Tetris, and under their Tengen subsidiary began development to port the title to the Nintendo Entertainment System (NES) in June 1988. The port was released in May 1989.

Mirrorsoft later sub-licensed the rights to Henk Rogers of Bullet-Proof Software to distribute Tetris in Japan. Around this same time, Nintendo was asked by Bullet-Proof Software with the prospect of developing a version of Tetris for the Game Boy, and Rogers traveled to Moscow to secure permission to distribute Tetris with the Game Boy. However, because Stein had secured the rights from Pajitnov directly and not from the Russian authorities, the USSR's Ministry of Software and Hardware Export stated that the console rights to Tetris had been licensed to nobody, and that Atari Games had only been licensed the rights to produce arcade games with the property. In April 1989, Tengen, who had previously filed an anti-trust suit against Nintendo, sued Nintendo again claiming rights to distribute Tetris on the NES, and Nintendo counter-sued citing infringement of trademark. In June 1989, a month after the release of Tengen's Tetris, U.S. District Court Judge Fern Smith issued an injunction barring Tengen from further distributing the game, and further ordered all existing copies of the game be destroyed. As a result, 268,000 Tetris cartridges were recalled and destroyed after only four weeks on shelves.

The art which was featured on the Tengen cover was an airbrush painting by well known illustrator Marc Ericksen featuring St. Basil's Cathedral in Red Square, Moscow, and featuring at its base a falling stone concept that mirrored the gameplay. Atari made use of the same art when advertising the new release, as seen in the Atari inset above right, adding a fireworks motif that was not a part of the original art.

In an interview, Ed Logg notes that the Tengen version of Tetris was built completely from scratch, using no source code or material from the original game. After presenting the title at the Consumer Electronics Show in Las Vegas, Tengen president Randy Broweleit requested improvements in the game. Originally portrayed solely in black and white, Broweleit requested that the pieces be portrayed in color, and Logg altered the game accordingly prior to the next Consumer Electronics Show. When asked which version of Tetris he liked the most, Logg stated the Nintendo version of Tetris for the NES "wasn't tuned right", citing a lack of logarithmic speed adjustment as the source of that version's overly steep increases in difficulty.

Reception
By the time of court order demanding Tengen cease distribution of the game and destroy all remaining copies, roughly 100,000 copies of the game had been sold, and it has since become a collector's item. The game has been noted as superior to Nintendo's own release for the NES, with 1UP.com noting its removal as a loss for players, citing its gameplay and two-player mode. However, in another article, they noted that if it were not for the hype surrounding the game during the lawsuit, Tengen's Tetris would have more likely than not been forgotten. GamesRadar stated similar sentiments, praising Tengen's version and noting that the Game Boy Tetris version was superior to Nintendo's licensed NES version as well. IGN placed the Tengen version at #48 on their list of the Top 100 NES games, noting its superiority to the official Nintendo version, which did not make the list.

References

External links

1988 video games
Atari arcade games
Nintendo Entertainment System games
Tetris
North America-exclusive video games
Tengen (company) games
Unauthorized video games
Video games scored by Brad Fuller
Video games developed in the United States
Multiplayer and single-player video games